Francesco Sibello (born 4 May 1945) is an Italian yacht racer who competed in the 1972 Summer Olympics.

References

1945 births
Living people
Italian male sailors (sport)
Olympic sailors of Italy
Sailors at the 1972 Summer Olympics – Tempest
Place of birth missing (living people)